Israel George "Izzy" Levene (May 1, 1885 – November 12, 1930) was an American football player and coach.  He served as the head football coach at the University of Tennessee from 1907 to 1909 and at Wake Forest University in 1922, compiling a career record of 18–15–5.

Player career
Levene played college football at the University of Pennsylvania, and was named an All-American in 1905 and 1906. In 1905, Penn went 12–0–1.  Levene was known for being a football player who worked hard to help out his team, as well as one of the first good pass catching ends.  The forward pass was legalized for the 1906 season.

Assistant coaching career
Levene coached under head coach John Heisman at the University of Pennsylvania.

Head coaching career
During his three-year tenure at Tennessee, Levene compiled a 15–10–3 record.  His best season came in 1907, when his team went 7–2–1.  His worst season came in 1909, when his team went 1–6–2, with the one win coming against Transylvania University.  In 1922, Levene served as the head coach at Wake Forest.  He compiled a 3–5–2 record there.

Later life
After coaching, Levene was a football official and wrote a book, Twenty Modern Football Plays.

Head coaching record

References

External links
 

1885 births
1930 deaths
American football ends
Penn Quakers football coaches
Penn Quakers football players
Tennessee Volunteers football coaches
Wake Forest Demon Deacons football coaches
Jewish American sportspeople